The siege of Maastricht may refer to one of several sieges:

 Siege of Maastricht (1579) by Spanish forces during the Eighty Years' War of 1568–1648
 Capture of Maastricht (1632) by Dutch forces during the Eighty Years' War of 1568–1648
 Siege of Maastricht (1673) by French forces during the Franco-Dutch War of 1672–1678
 Siege of Maastricht (1676) by Dutch forces during the Franco-Dutch War of 1672–1678
 Siege of Maastricht (1748) by French forces during the War of the Austrian Succession of 1740–1748
 Siege of Maastricht (1793) by French forces during the War of the First Coalition of 1792–1797
 Siege of Maastricht (1794) by French forces during the War of the First Coalition of 1792–1797